Nikolai Maspanov (born 22 December 1945 in Tallinn) is an Estonian politician. He was a member of VIII Riigikogu.

References

Living people
1945 births
Members of the Riigikogu, 1995–1999
Estonian people of Russian descent
Politicians from Tallinn